Meggarine Guedima is a neighbourhood in the oasis town of Megarine, in the southeast of Algeria. Administratively, it forms part of the municipality of Meggarine, which in itself is part of the Touggourt Province, Algeria.

References

Neighbouring towns and cities

Populated places in Touggourt Province